The men's heavyweight event was part of the boxing programme at the 1992 Summer Olympics. The weight class allowed boxers of up to 91 kilograms to compete. The competition was held from 28 July to 8 August 1992. 23 boxers from 23 nations competed.

Medalists

Results
The following boxers took part in the event:

First round
 Vojtěch Rückschloss (TCH) – BYE
 Georgios Stefanopoulos (GRE) – BYE
 David Tua (NZL) – BYE
 José Ortega (ESP) – BYE
 Kirk Johnson (CAN) – BYE
 Joseph Akhasamba (KEN) – BYE
 David Izonritei (NGR) – BYE
 Morteza Shiri (IRN) – BYE
 Arnold Vanderlyde (NED) def. Emelio Leti (SAM), 14:0
 Paul Douglas (IRL) def. John Pettersson (SWE), 8:1
 Alexey Chudinov (EUN) def. Vidas Markevičius (LTU), 7:3
 Željko Mavrović (CRO) def. Mark Hulström (DEN), 8:2
 Danell Nicholson (USA) def. Paul Lawson (GBR), 10:2
 Bert Teuchiert (GER) def. Elio Ibarra (ARG), 5:1
 Félix Savón (CUB) def. Krysztof Rojek (POL), RSC-2 (01:12)

Second round
 Vojtěch Rückschloss (TCH) def. Georgios Stefanopoulos (GRE), RSC-1 (02:27)
 David Tua (NZL) def. José Ortega (ESP), RSCH-2 (03:00)
 Kirk Johnson (CAN) def. Joseph Akhasamba (KEN), RSC-2 (02:42)
 David Izonritei (NGR) def. Morteza Shiri (IRN), RSC-3 (01:35)
 Arnold Vanderlyde (NED) def. Sung Bae Chae (KOR), 14:13
 Paul Douglas (IRL) def. Alexey Chudinov (EUN), 15:9
 Danell Nicholson (USA) def. Zelko Mavrovic (CRO), 9:6
 Félix Savón (CUB) def. Bert Teuchiert (GER), 11:2

Quarterfinals
 David Tua (NZL) def. Vojtěch Rückschloss (TCH), RSC-3 (00:16)
 David Izonritei (NGR) def. Kirk Johnson (CAN), 9:5
 Arnold Vanderlyde (NED) def. Paul Douglas (IRL), RSC-1 (01:30)
 Félix Savón (CUB) def. Danell Nicholson (USA), 13:11

Semifinals
 David Izonritei (NGR) def. David Tua (NZL), 12:7
 Félix Savón (CUB) def. Arnold Vanderlyde (NED), 23:3

Final
 Félix Savón (CUB) def. David Izonritei (NGR), 14:1

References

Heavyweight